Tolis Qaghan or Tolis Khagan (Töles qaγan) may refer to:
 Yami Qaghan (died 609), personal name Ashina Jankan (阿史那染干), a khagan of Eastern Turkic Khaganate, known in some point as Tolis Qaghan
 Tolis Qaghan (603–631), personal name Ashina Shibobi (阿史那什钵苾), son of Shibi Qaghan and thus a grandson of the man above, a khagan of Eastern Turkic Khaganate when the khaganate was defeated and became a vassal of Tang dynasty